No More Tears (For Lady Day) is a 1988 album by jazz pianist Mal Waldron recorded in West Germany and released on the Dutch Timeless label.

Reception 
The AllMusic review by Steve Loewy awarded the album 4 stars, stating: "The pianist is in a somber mood, perhaps because of the theme, though his performance is up to his usually high standards... The delightful ambience of the trio results in a laid-back atmosphere that soothes and calms. A fine antidote to a stressful world and a lovely tribute to Lady Day."

Track listing
All compositions by Mal Waldron except where noted.
 "Yesterdays" (Otto Harbach, Jerome Kern) – 7:13 
 "No More Tears" – 7:00 
 "Melancholy Waltz" – 5:54 
 "Solitude" (Eddie DeLange, Duke Ellington, Irving Mills) – 6:00 
 "Love Me or Leave Me" (Walter Donaldson, Gus Kahn) – 5:52 
 "All Night Through" – 6:36 
 "As Time Goes By" (Herman Hupfeld) – 7:03 
 "Smoke Gets in Your Eyes" (Otto Harbach, Jerome Kern) – 3:51 
 "Alone Together" (Howard Dietz, Arthur Schwartz) – 8:44

Recorded in Munich, West Germany on November 1, 2 & 3, 1988

Personnel 
 Mal Waldron – piano
 Paulo Cardoso – bass
 John Betsch – drums

References

1989 albums
Mal Waldron albums
Timeless Records albums